The McPhillips surname may be of Scottish or Irish origin, the surname is found predominantly in Ireland, in Cavan, Fermanagh and Monaghan counties. It is usually derived from the common surname Phillips.

Etymology and early Irish origins
The Christian name Philip was brought to Britain and Ireland by the Normans in the 12th century and was soon gaelicised to Pilib. The surname is of patronymic form and derives from the Gaelic Mac Pilib / Mac Philib, meaning "son of Philip", 

Historian Peadar Livingstone  claims it is possible that some Maguire's of Fermanagh may have anglicised to McPhillips, but generally the surname owes its origins to Pilib mac Séamus Mac Mathghamhna (Philip MacJames MacMahon). 

The McPhillips surname was found to be the 31st most numerous in County Monaghan in 1970. It is almost exclusive in Dartry where it is the 7th most common surname. In Connacht, Phillips is an Anglicisation of McPhilbin which is one of the Hibernicised branches of the Burke clan. The surname was used interchangeably with Mac Philib & McPhillips, but most later dropped the Mc/Mac prefix.

Early Scottish origins
In Scotland, different variations of the surname can be found in Inverness-shire and Argyllshire. The most common version is McKillop, which can be represented in Scottish Gaelic as MacFhilib and MacPhilip.
 The McPhillips surname is largely found in the Scottish Lowlands around Lanarkshire and West Lothian, where the surname is the 37th most common surname; the 1841 Scotland Census records indicated that most were of Irish origin at that time.

People named McPhillips

Politics
Albert McPhillips (1904–1971), Canadian politician
Albert Edward McPhillips (1862–1938), Canadian Politician & Barrister
Jack McPhillips (1910–2004), Australian communist and trade unionist
Mary M. McPhillips, US politician
Richie McPhillips, SDLP politician

Sports
Bill McPhillips (1910–1992), Newcastle United goalkeeper
Cian McPhillips, Irish middle-distance runner
Colin McPhillips, American surfer
Conor McPhillips, Irish rugby player
Frank McPhillips, former Dublin Gaelic footballer
Johnny McPhillips, Irish & Ulster rugby player
Karl McPhillips, Irish chess player
Lee-Ann McPhillips, former long-distance runner from New Zealand
Paul McPhillips, former Scottish snooker player
Terry McPhillips, former professional footballer

Culture
Joseph A. McPhillips III (1937–2007), American schoolteacher

Film/Television
Andrew McPhillips, British director; CGI artist
Hugh McPhillips (1920–1990), American actor, director
Mary Helen McPhillips (1931–1998), American/Canadian television personality

Music
Kevin McPhillips is founding member & lead guitarist of the Manchester Band, Cohesion (band)
Dave McPhillips is lead guitarist of the Irish Indie Rock Band, The Coronas
John McPhillips, Irish composer

Other
Julian L. McPhillips (born 1946), US lawyer

See also
List of Irish clans in Ulster
List of Irish clans

Place names
McPhillips Street Station Casino
McPhillips Street, Winnipeg

References

Anglicised Irish-language surnames
Anglicised Scottish Gaelic-language surnames
Surnames of Irish origin
Irish families
Patronymic surnames